Hornindal is a former municipality in the old Sogn og Fjordane county, Norway. It existed from 1867 until 1965 and then again from 1977 until 2020. It was located in the traditional district of Nordfjord. The administrative centre of the municipality was the village of Grodås. The municipality was located at the eastern end of the lake Hornindalsvatnet, the deepest lake in Northern Europe. The rest of the lake lies inside neighboring Eid Municipality.

The European route E39 highway runs through Hornindal Municipality as it makes its route along the western coast of Norway. The Kviven Tunnel was completed in 2012 as part of the new E39 route connecting Hornindal to Volda Municipality in Møre og Romsdal county to the north. The tunnel was constructed to avoid the ferry crossing over the Voldsfjorden and it shortened the distance from Hornindal to Volda significantly.

At the time of its dissolution in 2020, the  municipality is the 334th largest by area out of the 422 municipalities in Norway. Hornindal is the 381st most-populous municipality in Norway, with a population of 1,175.

General information

Since ancient times, Hornindal was a sub-parish of Eid prestegjeld (see formannskapsdistrikt law). In 1865, Hornindal became a parish of its own and then two years later, on 1 January 1867, Hornindal was established as a separate municipality. At this time, Hornindal had a population of 1,612.

During the 1960s, there were many municipal mergers across Norway due to the work of the Schei Committee. On 1 January 1965, the municipality of Hornindal was dissolved and it was divided between the neighboring municipalities of Eid and Stryn. Navelsaker and Holmøyvik and all of Hornindal west of there (population: 310) was transferred to Eid, and the 1,184 residents to the east of those areas went to Stryn. This, however, was not long-lasting. On 1 January 1977, the area of the old municipality of Hornindal was separated from Stryn and recreated as a separate municipality once again. The portions of Hornindal that were moved to Eid in 1964 remained there. The new Hornindal municipality had a population of 1,202.

On 1 January 2019, the Maurset area in southern Hornindal (population: 19) was transferred from Hornindal to the neighboring municipality of Stryn.

On 1 January 2020, Hornindal (in Sogn og Fjordane county) merged with the neighboring Volda Municipality and joined Møre og Romsdal county.

Name
The municipality (originally the parish) was named after the old farm called Horne, since the first Hornindal Church was built there. The first element is horn which means "horn" (here referring to a pointed mountain behind the farm) and the last element is vin which means "meadow" or "pasture". So the meaning of the compounded name Hornindal is "the valley/dale of Horne".

Coat of arms
The coat of arms was granted on 7 August 1987. They were designed by Petter Eide. It shows three silver blades of scythes on a blue background. Historically, farming and blacksmithing were vital industries in Hornindal. At one point, there were as many as 200 blacksmiths in the area. There was also a rich tradition of making handmade scythes and this was very symbolized by putting scythes on the coat-of-arms.

Churches
The Church of Norway had one parish within the municipality of Hornindal. It is part of the Nordfjord prosti (deanery) in the Diocese of Bjørgvin.

Government
All municipalities in Norway, including Hornindal, are responsible for primary education (through 10th grade), outpatient health services, senior citizen services, unemployment and other social services, zoning, economic development, and municipal roads.  The municipality is governed by a municipal council of elected representatives, which in turn elects a mayor.  The municipality falls under the Sogn og Fjordane District Court and the Gulating Court of Appeal.

Municipal council
The municipal council of Hornindal was made up of 17 representatives that were elected to four-year terms. The party breakdown of the final municipal council was as follows:

Mayor
The mayor (ordførar) of a municipality in Norway is a representative of the majority party of the municipal council who is elected to lead the council. Stig Olav Lødemel of the Conservative Party was elected mayor for the 2015–2019 term.

Geography

Location
Hornindal is located on the northern border of Sogn og Fjordane county. Hornindal is bordered to the west by the municipality of Eid, to the south by Stryn, to the east by Stranda (in Møre og Romsdal county), and to the north by Ørsta and Volda (both in Møre og Romsdal county).

Mountains
Hornindalsrokken mountain
Gulkoppen mountain
Middagsfjellet

Tourist attractions

Hornindalsvatnet
None of the glacier streams run out into the lake and this has resulted in one of Europe's clearest lakes.

Anders Svor Museum
Anders Svor was born in 1864 on the Svor Farm in Hornindal. At the age of 21 he left for Denmark where he enrolled at the Copenhagen Academy of Art. He later participated in many art exhibitions in Kristiania, Copenhagen, Paris, and Chicago. The Anders Svor Museum was opened in 1953 and features 450 of his works. His art is characterised by simple, clean lines, and deep authenticity.

Notable people
Anders Fannemel (born 1991), ski jumper
Frode Grodås (born 1964), footballer
Bjørn Lødemel (born 1958), politician
Brita Lund (1886–1966), artist
Anders Svor (1864–1929), sculptor

References

External links
Municipal fact sheet from Statistics Norway 
Official website of Hornindal 
NRK: Hornindal 
Webcam in Hornindal 

 
Former municipalities of Norway
1867 establishments in Norway
1965 disestablishments in Norway
1977 establishments in Norway
2020 disestablishments in Norway